Santa Maria dei Miracoli (i.e. "St. Mary of the Miracles") is a Baroque church located in Ragusa, Sicily.

It was built in the mid-seventeenth century, following the discovery of an image of the Madonna with her Child Jesus. The discovery of the sacred image was considered a miraculous event and gave impetus to the construction of a temple in honor of the Madonna.

References

External links 

Roman Catholic churches in Ragusa
Baroque architecture in Ragusa
17th-century Roman Catholic church buildings in Italy